Clément Haeyen (13 June 1927 – 20 April 2012) was a Belgian weightlifter. He competed at the 1960 Summer Olympics.

References

1927 births
2012 deaths
Belgian male weightlifters
Olympic weightlifters of Belgium
Weightlifters at the 1960 Summer Olympics
Sportspeople from Bruges
20th-century Belgian people